House Party was a Canadian talk show television series which aired on CBC Television from 1954 to 1955.

Premise
Michele Tisseyre interviewed guests who were mostly entertainers or sportspeople. Each guest was introduced with a narrated film or photograph montage.

Scheduling
This half-hour series aired on alternate Tuesdays at 10:30 p.m. (Eastern) from 26 October 1954 to 5 February 1955. What's My Line was broadcast on the other Tuesdays until December, after which House Party alternated with Make a Match.

References

External links
 

CBC Television original programming
1954 Canadian television series debuts
1955 Canadian television series endings
Black-and-white Canadian television shows